Roberto Paci Dalò is an Italian author, composer and musician, film maker and theatre director, sound and visual artist, radio-maker. He is the co-founder and director of the performing arts ensemble Giardini Pensili and he has been the artistic director of Wikimania 2016 Esino Lario. He won the Premio Napoli per la lingua e la cultura italiana in 2015.

Life and career 
After musical, visual, and architecture studies in Fiesole, Faenza and Ravenna, in 1993 he receives the DAAD Artists-in-Berlin Program Fellowship. He taught Media Dramaturgy and New Media at the University of Siena and teaches Interaction Design at UNIRSM Design Università degli Studi della Repubblica di San Marino. Since 2017 he is founder and director of Usmaradio, radio station and Research Centre for Radiophonic Studies.

In 1993 he conceives the project Publiphono – based on the public address system of the Rimini beach – used to create environmental audio performance along 15 km of the coast; several artists were commissioned to produce pieces for it. In 1994 with Marina Abramović and Barbara Bloom he has been invited to the project “Bildende Kunst auf dem Theater” at Hebbel-Theater, Berlin.
In 1995 the Kronos Quartet premiered at the Vienna Opera House his composition Nodas. 
In 1997 he creates Trance Bakxai, an artist's rave inspired by Euripides. This project has been presented several times in industrial archeology venues. 
In 2001 he stages the performance work Metamorfosi created through a one-month film scanning of the Palazzo della Civiltà Italiana in Roma EUR: the modernist icon from 1942. The performance became then a film which has been part of the official selection of the 54th Locarno Film Festival. In the same year he presented the film RAX, dedicated to the artist Robert Adrian X, at the Vienna Kunsthalle.
In 2002 he creates with the English artist and musician Philip Jeck the film and concert performance Mush Room.
2004 he co-creates with Olga Neuwirth the staged concert Italia anno zero after texts by Antonio Gramsci, Pier Paolo Pasolini and Giacomo Leopardi widely presented across Europe. 
2006 he creates the music-theatre production Organo magico organo laico featuring Mouse on Mars and Icarus musicians at the REC Festival (Teatro Valli, Reggio Emilia). In the same year he creates the music-theatre work Cenere after texts by Amelia Rosselli and Gabriele Frasca (Teatro Comunale di Monfalcone).

In 2007 he presents his solo exhibition City Works - urban explorations and interventions in the cities of Berlin, Ciudad de México, Linz, Napoli, Rimini, Rome, Vancouver - at the Gallery SESV (University of Florence - Department of Architecture). In the same year he presents his solo exhibition Sparks (site-specific installation and drawings on paper) at the contemporary arts centre Palazzo delle Papesse Siena and the videoinstallation Shadows at Studio Zero, the exhibition space of Duomo Hotel created by Ron Arad in Rimini. In the same year he presents a triple project at the Ars Electronica Festival in Linz. In that occasion he performed Napoli (the historical work created in 1993 and already presented in Linz in 1995). Napoli is an immersive multi-channel sound portrait of the Italian city. Within the festival he premiered the film IMA Fiction #3 Heidi Grundmann (a portrait of the seminal figure in radio and telecommunication world) and the electronic performance Elektra.

In 2008 as part of the Napoli Teatro Festival he directs and composes the cycle of 11 music-theatre performances L'assedio delle ceneri featuring actors like Umberto Orsini, Franco Branciaroli, Massimo Popolizio a.o. Paci Dalò created the sculpture "Sun Tzu" under invitation of the Galleria Civica di Modena (2010) and the work "Smallville#1" as part of the Bologna Art First 2011. In 2011 he presented the site-specific large scale music-theatre work De bello Gallico - Enklave Rimini.

In 2012 he creates in Shanghai the audio-visual performance Ye Shanghai; the project deals with several aspects of the Shanghainese life before 1949. At the core of this work is the story of the Shanghai Ghetto, an area of approximately one square mile located in the Hongkou District of Japanese-occupied Shanghai. It housed about 23,000 Jewish refugees relocated by the Japanese-issued Proclamation Concerning Restriction of Residence and Business of Stateless Refugees, after they fled from the German-occupied Europe before and during World War II.
He produced a series of Berlin projects based on Heiner Müller's texts: Greuelmärchen - sound/video installation (Internationale Heiner Müller Gesellschaft, Berlin), Schwarzes Licht, Roter Schnee.

He collaborates with a number of institutions and research centres including the Joint Research Centre of the  European Commission, the University of the Republic of San Marino, University of Bologna, IULM University Milan, University of Newcastle Culture Lab (UK), Domus Academy Milan, Brera Fine Arts Academy Milan, Ascoli Piceno and Rome universities, and Great Northern Way Campus, where he develops projects between technology, art, and the urban space in collaboration with designers, architects, city planners, artists, programmers, theoreticians and hackers. 
He is member of the Internationale Heiner Müller Gesellschaft Berlin. He is artist-in-residence at Djerassi Foundation (San Francisco), STEIM (Amsterdam), Ars Electronica FutureLab (Linz), Montévidéo and GMEM (Marseille), La Bellone (Bruxelles), Western Front (Vancouver), Tonspur / MuseumsQuartier (Vienna).

Works 
Roberto Paci Dalò has developed a multi-layered language out of his background in sound and visual arts, which combines the spoken language with body and architecture. His work uses new technologies in combination with an analysis on classical tragic drama. The areas of work of Roberto Paci Dalò includes robotics, cybernetics, man-machine interaction, psychoacoustics, realtime video and sound processing. He wrote, composed and directed since 1985 about 40 music-theatre works presented worldwide. He composed music for acoustical ensembles, electronics, voices and a large number of radioworks produced by European broadcasting corporations. His production of films and videos is regularly presented in international festivals. His dramaturgical materials are frequently re-composed in sound and video installations – often site specific and interactive – presented in museums, galleries, and the public space. As performer he developed extended techniques on the clarinet and with electronics and sampler. 
His performances range from solo to electro-acoustical ensembles and improvised music projects in collaboration with other artists. His interest in traditional cultures brought him into explorations and field researches through the Mediterranean, Eastern Europe, Balkans and the North West European islands. He works on expansions of radio language(s) especially through his long-term collaboration with ORF Kunstradio. Among his on-site/on-air/on-line projects: La Natura Ama Nascondersi (Kunstradio 1992), Napoli (Nantes 1994, official selection Prix Italia), La lunga notte (1993, award EBU/UER), Lost Memories (Graz 1994, official selection Prix Futura), Many Many Voices (Haus der Kulturen der Welt, Berlino 1995, CD Edel Records / Akademie der Künste Berlin), Fuori Luogo (commissioned by SFB Sender Freies Berlin for the Prix Europa 98 opening), OZ (SFB / Sonambiente 1996), Italia anno zero (2005), L'assedio delle ceneri (RAI, 2008). 
Urban explorations is a fundamental aspect of his work. He collects soundscapes since the beginning of the 80's. His interest in urban spaces brought him to the creation of a corpus of sound and visual work based on this research. Some of this activity is documented on-line in the permanent website Atlas Linz (since 1998) created in collaboration with the Ars Electronica Center Linz. The site is conceived as an open net space devoted to urban explorations and interventions. He develops interfaces and software/hardware in different research centres & foundations.

Curatorial work 
He founded in 1985 the performing arts ensemble Giardini Pensili with Isabella Bordoni. Between 1991 and 1998 he creates and curates in Rimini the International radio + art festival LADA L’Arte dell'Ascolto. He brought to Rimini artists like Heiner Goebbels, Ensemble Modern, Llorenç Barber, Soldier String Quartet, Scanner, David Moss, Rupert Huber (Tosca), Sam Auinger, Hannes Strobl, Tibor Szemzö a.o. Since 1990 he is curator and co-ordinator of international projects based on telecommunication systems and the Internet as working places (i.e. trustee of the Mediterranean network of Horizontal Radio, Ars Electronica 1995; Rivers & Bridges). In 1995 opens the Giardini Pensili Web Site. In 1995 he creates Radio Lada - web art radio. Between 1999 and 2001 he is the curator of Itaca - the electronic stage of the Teatro di Roma - working together with Mario Martone and he is co-curator of the project Aria-Net (Marseille, Lisbon, Rimini, Vienna). In 2000 he curates — invited by RAI — part of the Radio and Internet programme within the Prix Italia (Bologna-Rimini) and in 2004 he creates the label LADA L’Arte dell’Ascolto devoted to electronics, spoken words, soundscape and urban explorations.
Between 2006 and 2016 – when the structure closed down – he was the artistic director of the contemporary arts centre Velvet Factory (Rimini), a large-scale creation lab and a residence space in Rimini. The multidisciplinary centre hosted events from sound to cinema (with a particular attention to documentary, animation and live cinema), passing through performing arts (dance, music, theatre), radio, visual arts, design, architecture, words, fashion, philosophy and it was conceived as a centre promoting culture, a creative city and the cultural district, mixed media and dramaturgy, contemporary arts’ language and electronics within a Time Based Arts approach. Within Velvet Factory operated the Velvet-Lab think-tank and creative studio.

Authors and writings 
Since the end of the 80's he composes and directs radio works commissioned by European broadcasting corporations (RAI, ORF, DeutschlandRadio, WDR among others), working on texts by Predrag Matvejevic', Samih al-Qasim, Yehuda Amichai, Ingeborg Bachmann, Walter Benjamin, Giorgio Agamben, Antonio Pizzuto, Heiner Müller, Giacomo Leopardi, Antonio Gramsci. He has been working on texts by Samuel Beckett, Euripides, Shakespeare, Gabriele Frasca, Pier Paolo Pasolini, Alexandra Petrova, Colette Tron, Tommaso Ottonieri, Emily Dickinson, Daniel Varujan, Amelia Rosselli, Alessandro Dal Lago, Jolanda Insana, Tommaso Ottonieri, Lello Voce, Piergiorgio Odifreddi, Stefano Boeri, Giacomo Lubrano, Patrizia Valduga.

Collaborations 
His music has been performed by musicians like David Moss, Kronos Quartet, Philip Jeck, Rupert Huber, Esti Kenan-Ofri, Giorgio Magnanensi, Sainkho Namtchylak, Icarus Ensemble, Gerfried Stocker, Giancarlo Cardini, Stefano Scodanibbio, Tenores di Bitti, Gordon Monahan, Joélle Leändre, Roberto Lucanero. Other collaborations include musicians Alvin Curran, Andrea Felli, Robert Lippok, Fred Frith, Jon Rose, Robin Rimbaud aka Scanner, Tom Cora, Mouse on Mars, Terry Riley; artists Peter Courtemanche, Kurt Hentschläger, Horst Hörtner, Richard Long, Hermann Nitsch, Hermann De Vries, Oreste Zevola, Maurizio Cattelan, Robert Adrian X, Paolo Rosa; writers Yehuda Amichai, Samih al-Qasim, Predrag Matvejevic', Gabriele Frasca, Giorgio Agamben, Patrizia Valduga; dancers Adriana Borriello, Caterina Sagna. He directed on-stage actors like Umberto Orsini, Massimo Popolizio, Saverio La Ruina, Enzo Moscato, Franco Branciaroli, Silvio Orlando, Nicoletta Fabbri, Anna Bonaiuto, Sandro Lombardi, Rita Maffei, Fabiano Fantini, Marcello Sambati, Heiko Senst, Roberto Latini.

Theatre and Music-Theatre 

 Sentieri Segreti, 1985
 Corrispondenze Naturali, 1986
 Sound House, 1986
 Un cantico / partiture sonore, 1986
 A Harmonic Walk, 1987
 Cave di pietra, 1987
 Il calore della terra, 1987
 Nel fondo del giardino, 1987
 Terre Unite, 1988
 Terre Separate, 1988
 Temporale, 1989
 Terrae Motvs, 1991
 Niemandsland, 1992
 Terra di Nessuno, 1993
 Auroras, 1994
 Metrodora, 1996
 Scanning Bacchae, 1997
 Trance Bakxai, 1997
 Nishmat Hashmal, 1998
 Cieli altissimi retrocedenti, 1998
 Enigma, 1998
 Stasimi, 1998
 Sophon Sophia, 1998
 Il Cartografo, 1999
 Affreschi / due porte per Tebe, 1999
 Sirene, 2000
 Shir, 2000
 Animalie, 2002
 Blue Stories, 2001
 Metamorfosi, 2001
 Local & Long Distance, 2003
 Petrolio / Rose, 2003
 Stelle della sera, 2004
 Filmnero, 2004
 Altri fuochi, 2005
 Porpora, 2005
 Italia anno zero, 2005
 Petroleo México, 2005
 Tremante omaggio, 2005
 Qual è la parola, 2006
 Organo magico organo laico, 2006
 Words, 2006
 Cenere, 2006
 L'assedio delle ceneri, 2008
 Roter Schnee, 2009
 Black Beauty, 2011
 De bello Gallico - Enklave Rimini, 2011
 Ye Shanghai, 2012
 Il grande bianco, 2014
 1915 The Armenian Files, 2015
 Niggunim, 2018
 Niggunim | Nobori, 2018
 Repertoire, 2021

Radio and Telematic Projects 
 1989 Segnali radio sulla costa atlantica. ORF / Kunstradio, Vienna. ORF 1, 26.1.1989.
 1989 Quattro canti sulla circolarità del tempo. RAI Radiouno / Audiobox. RAI Radiouno, 16.2.1989.
 1991 Combattimento tra Marsia e Apollo. Opera radiofonica by Roberto Paci Dalò and Jon Rose. SFB Sender Freies Berlin, SFB, June 1991.
 1992 La natura ama nascondersi: Mozart in Budapest 1791-1832. Giardini Pensili, ORF Vienna "Geometrie des Schweigens", Vienna, Palais Lichtenstein Museum Moderner Kunst- Innsbruckl, Tyrolean State Museum in interactive video and sound connection, 1992
 1992 Niemandsland. ORF Kunstradio Vienna, with the collaboration of Transit Innsbruck and Giardini Pensili Innsbruck, Tiroler Landesmuseum and Landesstudio Tirol, 1992
 1993 La lunga notte Halaila Ha'aroch / Leilun Tauil. Österreichischer Rundfunk / Kunstradio, RAI Radiotelevisione Italiana / Audiobox, L'Arte dell'Ascolto. 30.8.1993
 1993 Napoli. Giardini Pensili, ORF Kunstradio, L'Alfabeto Urbano in collaboration with RAI Radiouno Audiobox, October 1993
 1994 Lost Memories. Giardini Pensili Rimini, ESC Graz, ORF Kunstradio with the collaboration of RAI Radiotre Audiobox, Graz ESC / ORF1, 29.9.1994
1995 Realtime. ORF Kunstradio. 1.12.1995
 1995 Many Many Voices. SFB Sender Freies Berlin, Giardini Pensili Rimini, ORF Kunstradio Vienna, RNE Radio-2 Madrid, YLE Yleisradio Helsinki with the collaboration of: Institut Français de Berlin, Italienischer Kulturinstitut Berlin, Österreichischer Generalkonsulat Berlin, Elektronisches Studio der TU. Simultaneous Live Broadcasting. SFB 4 MultiKulti and YLE Finland in performance from the Haus der Kulturen der Welt Berlin. 29.1.1995
 1995 Horizontal Radio. 23.6.1995.
 1996 Oz. Akademie der Künste Berlin, Sender Freies Berlin, Giardini Pensili. Berlin, SFB Lichthof, 7.3.1996
 1996 Terra di nessuno. Giardini Pensili, RAI Audiobox. RAI Radiotre Audiobox March 30.3.1996
 1996 Shpil. Phonurgia Nova Arles, Giardini Pensili, RAI Audiobox, San Marino RTV, Kunsthochschule für Medien Cologne, Kol Israel. RAI Radiotre Audiobox 10.8.1996
 1998 Atlanti invisibili. Giardini Pensili, RAI Audiobox. ORF Kunstradio. 3.9.1998
 1998 Genetliaco. RAI Audiobox, July 1998
 2001 Blue Stories - Vienna Remix. Giardini Pensili in collaboration with ORF Kunstradio, RaiNet. ORF Kunstradio, July 3.7.2001
 2002 Devolve into II. Oesterreich 1 and Radio Oesterreich International. 17.3.2002
Kunstradio Live radio version in conjunction with the on site installation in Vienna. From studio RP4, Vienna Broadcastinghouse. Klangtheater Live radio. March 24.3.2002
Bayern2Radio/ hr2 /WDR 3/ Oe1/ NordwestRadio/ SR2.
Intermedium 2 - radio broadcast (mix from the Klangtheater installation in Vienna).
ZKM Radio/Intermedium2 Radio piece. Oesterreich 1 and Radio Oesterreich International. March 31.3.2002
 2002 Transfert. musikprotokoll im steirischen herbst, Transcultures Bruxelles und Wien Modern in Zusammenarbeit mit dem Ö1 Kunstradio. ORF Kunstradio, 3.11.2002
 2004 Italia Anno Zero. By Olga Neuwirth and Roberto Paci Dalò. Giardini Pensili & Wien Modern in collaboration with Budapest Autumn Festival, ORF Kunstradio, Terra Gramsci supported by Réseau Varèse and the European Commission (Culture 2000). ORF Kunstradio, 28.10.2004 
 2005 Kol Beck - Living Strings. WDR Studio Akustische Kunst, Cologne, 24.9.2005
 2008 L'assedio delle ceneri. RAI Radiotre. Eleven episodes, June–July 2008
 2009 Merkur. ORF Kunstradio, Vienna Funkhaus, 6.12.2009
 2013 Ye Shanghai. ORF Kunstradio, Vienna Funkhaus, 13.1.2013
 2015 1915 The Armenian Files. ORF Kunstradio, Vienna Funkhaus, 3.5.2015
 2017 For Morton Feldman. In collaboration with Rupert Huber. ORF Kunstradio, Vienna Funkhaus, 15.1.2017
 2017 Long Night Talks. For Robert Adrian. ORF Kunstradio, Vienna Funkhaus, 30.7.2017
 2020 CROWN. Usmaradio, series of 33 episodes
 2020 Hannah. Radio India
 2020 HA. ORF Kunstradio, Vienna, 27.12.2020

Discography 
 Napoli (1993)
 Ars Acustica International - EBU Selection 1994 /La lunga notte/ (1995)
 Many Many Voices (1995)
 Horizontal Radio (1996)
 Familie Auer (1996)
 Sumi /Various/ (1998)
 Ozio (2000)
 City Sonics /EMN40/ (2003)
 In Two Worlds (2004)
 Pneuma (2004)
 AVN+RPD (with Absolute Value of Noise) (2005)
 WITZ FM (with Francesca Mizzoni) (2006)
 Sparks (2007)
 Alluro (2010)
 The Maya Effect (with Scanner) (2011)
 Japanese Girls at the Harbor (with Yasuhiro Morinaga)(2012)
 Ye Shanghai (2014)
 1915 The Armenian Files (2015)
 Long Night Talks (2020)

Filmography 
 2001 Camera Obscura - based on the music-theatre performance Metamorfosi starring Anna Bonaiuto (Official selection Locarno Film Festival)
 2001 RAX - a documentary - interview to Canadian artist Robert Adrian X (Official selection Locarno Film Festival)
 2001 Blue Stories - live cinema (Official selection Locarno Film Festival)
 2002 EMN40 - film after the audio-video installation commissioned by the Ensemble Musiques Nouvelles for its 40th anniversary
 2003 Dust - film created as a contribution to the Rome Quadriennale (Official selection Locarno Film Festival)
 2005 Petroleo México - filmed in Ciudad de México (Official selection Locarno Film Festival)
 2007 Shadows - after the videoinstallation for the Duomo Hotel created by Ron Arad
 2007 IMA Portrait #3 Heidi Grundmann - a documentary - interview to Kunstradio's founder and former producer Heidi Grundmann
 2008 Nitschland Napoli - film created under invitation of the Fondazione Morra Napoli on the occasion of the Museo Hermann Nitsch's opening
 2009 Atlas of Emotion Stream - after Giuliana Bruno's book "Atlas of Emotion". Film commissioned by PAN Palazzo delle Arti Napoli
 2013 Ye Shanghai
 2015 1915 The Armenian Files
 2017 Douala Flow
 2018 In darkness let me dwell
 2019 Appunto Angheben

Books
 AA.VV., Re-inventing Radio - Aspects of radio as art, Heidi Grundmann, Elisabeth Zimmermann, Reinhard Braun, Dieter Daniels, Andreas Hirsch, Anne Thurmann-Jajes (edited by), Frankfurt am Main: Revolver books, 2008, .
 Bordoni, Isabella, Paci Dalò, Roberto, Giardini Pensili. Il libro dei paesaggi, Ravenna: Exit Edizioni, 1987.
 Montecchi, Leonardo, Paci Dalò, Roberto (edited by), Officine della dissociazione, Bologna: Pitagora Editrice, 2000.
 Fragliasso, Savina, Paci Dalò, Roberto, Pneuma. Giardini Pensili un paesaggio sonoro, Monfalcone: Teatro Comunale di Monfalcone, 2005.
 Paci Dalò, Roberto, Quinz, Emanuele (edited by), Millesuoni. Deleuze, Guattari e la musica elettronica, Napoli: Cronopio, 2006.
 Paci Dalò, Roberto, Storie di lupi e lepri, Napoli: Hde, 2009.
 Paci Dalò, Roberto, Filmnero, Milano: Marsèll, 2016. 
 Paci Dalò, Roberto, Ombre, Macerata: Quodlibet, 2019.

Critical response 
His work has won him international admiration from among others, John Cage and Aleksandr Sokurov.

“Roberto Paci Dalò's concert at the Experimental Intermedia (NYC) was a surprise and a pleasure for me. His attention to details is exactly what we need right now. The concert was a wonderful example in the nuances intonation and in the representation of the clarinet as a solo instrument and in the joining of music to words”.
Robert Ashley

"...if the new multimedia is going anywhere at all, Paci Dalò's "Animalie" is leading the way, a truly great show!!!!"
Alvin Curran

"I enjoyed your music very much and wish you great success in your future projects".
John Zorn

" ... The most important thing is that everything works for the music. Music indefinitely simple and beautiful. This is an opera for me! An indefinitely simple, beautiful, and serious opera! "(about the opera Auroras, Berlin Hebbel-Theater).
Giya Kancheli

References

Further reading 
 La porta aperta 2, Roma: Teatro di Roma, 1999.
 Andrea Balzola, La scena tecnologica, Roma: Dino Audino editore, 2011.
 Tatiana Bazzichelli, Networking. The Net as Artwork, Aarhus: Digital Aesthetics Research Center, 2008.
 Tiziano Bonini, Roberto Paci Dalò, il drammaturgo dei media, Doppiozero, 1.2.2016.
 Barbara Casavecchia, Roberto Paci Dalò in "Frieze", n. 153, March 2013.
 Valerio Dehò, Silenzio. Sei meditazioni oltre il rumore, Reggio Emilia: Comune di Reggio Emilia, 1997.
 Gabriele Frasca and Renato Quaglia, eds. Prediche per il nuovo millennio, Dall'assedio delle ceneri, Venezia: Napoli Teatro Festival / Marsilio, 2008.
 Laura Gemini, L'incertezza creativa, Milano: Franco Angeli, 2003.
 Helga de la Motte-Haber, ed. Klangkunst, Munich: Prestel, 1996.
 Lorenzo Mango and Giuseppe Morra, Living Theatre: labirinti dell'immaginario, Napoli: Edizioni Fondazione Morra, 2003.
 Peppino Ortoleva and Barbara Scaramucci, eds. le Garzantine. Radio, Milano: Garzanti, 2003.
 Fabio Paracchini, Cybershow. Cinema e teatro con Internet. Milano: Ubulibri, 1996.
 Emanuele Quinz, ed, Digital Performance, Paris: Anomos, 2002.
 Annmarie Chandler and Norie Neumark, eds. Precursors to art and activism on the Internet, MIT Press, 2005.
 Wolfgang Storch and Klaudia Ruschkowski, eds. Sire, das war ich. Leben Gundlings Friedrich von Preußen Lessings Schlaf Traum Schrei Heiner Müller Werkbuch, Berlin: Theater der Zeit, 2007.

External links 

 
 Usmaradio
 Internationale Heiner Müller Gesellschaft

1962 births
Living people
People from Rimini
20th-century classical composers
21st-century classical composers
Italian theatre directors
Italian film directors
Italian classical composers
Italian sound artists
Italian installation artists
Italian contemporary artists
Experimental composers
Italian opera composers
Male opera composers
Contemporary classical music performers
Academic staff of the University of Siena
20th-century Italian composers
20th-century Italian male musicians
21st-century Italian male musicians